The Yale or Centicore (Latin: Eale) is a mythical beast found in European mythology and heraldry.

Description
The Yale is described as an antelope- or goat-like creature with the tusks of a boar and large horns. These horns possess the ability to swivel in any direction which makes them good for both offensive and defensive attacks.

The name Yale is believed to be derived from the Hebrew word יָעֵל (Yael), meaning "ibex". Other common names this creature parades under is "Eales" or "Centicores".

The Yale was first written about by Pliny the Elder in Book VIII of his Natural History. He describes the Eale as a creature found in Aethiopia: "it is the size of the river-horse, has the tail of the elephant, and is of a black or tawny colour. It has also the jaws of the wild boar, and horns that are moveable, and more than a cubit in length, so that, in fighting, it can employ them alternately, and vary their position by presenting them directly or obliquely, according as necessity may dictate."  After its first mention in this book the creature moved into medieval bestiaries and heraldry, where it represents proud defense.

Heraldic symbol

The Yale is among the heraldic beasts used by the British Royal Family. It was used as a supporter for the arms of John, Duke of Bedford, and by England's House of Beaufort. Its connection with the British monarchy began with Henry VII in 1485. Henry Tudor’s mother, Lady Margaret (1443–1509), was a Beaufort, and the Beaufort heraldic legacy inherited by both her and her son included the Yale.

Yale in the modern world

Lady Margaret Beaufort was a benefactor of Cambridge's Christ's College and St John's College and her Yale can be seen on the college gatehouses. There are also a pair on the roof of St George's Chapel in Windsor Castle. The Yale of Beaufort was one of the Queen's Beasts commissioned for the coronation in 1953; the plaster originals are in Canada, stone copies are at Kew Gardens, outside the palm house.

In the US, the Yale is associated with Yale University in New Haven, Connecticut. Although the school's primary sports mascot is a bulldog named Handsome Dan, the Yale can be found throughout the university campus. The mythical beast occupies two quadrants of the coat of arms of the Yale Faculty of Arts and Sciences (FAS). The Yale is also depicted on the official banner of the president of the university, which, along with a wooden mace capped by a Yale's head, is carried and displayed during commencement exercises each spring. They can also be seen above the gateway to Yale's Davenport College and the pediment of Timothy Dwight College. The student-run campus radio station, WYBCX Yale Radio, uses the Yale as its logo.

Explanation

Just as most myths seek to explain the natural world so do the descriptions of its creatures. It is believed that the creature that  Pliny the Elder describe in his book as the Yale could have been the result of catching a glimpse of modern day animals. Through his journey he notes the sighting of this creature while on the sub-Saharan African plains. Animals we know to be the Antelope or Water Buffalo inhabit this area and loosely match the description of the Yale.

References

 Carol Rose, Giants, Monsters, and Dragons: An Encyclopedia of Folklore, Legend, and Myth, (2000) New York City: W.W. Norton. .

 Donna M. Hrynkiw, The Yale: Heraldic Beast (August 20, 1998).

External links
 Medieval Bestiary: Yale

Medieval European legendary creatures
Heraldic beasts
Mythological caprids